This article lists the various political parties in Cameroon.

Cameroon is a one party dominant state with the Cameroon People's Democratic Movement in power. Opposition parties are allowed, but are widely considered to have no real chance of gaining power.

Parties represented in the National Assembly

Other parties 
 Respect Unity for all African Integration (Rufasca, Ambazonians, Southern Cameroonians) - Oussama Al-Suhaiqi. 
 Union of the Peoples of Cameroon (Union des Populations du Cameroun) - Cecil Odhiambo.
 Cameroonian Party of Democrats (Parti des Démocrates Camerounais) - Mohammed El-Maghrabi (Petu)*
 Alliance for Democracy and Development (Alliance pour la Démocratie et le Développement) - Marcel Yondo*
 Cameroon Reformation Party (CRP-Party) - Foligar Kum Lang
 Parti Republicain du Cameroun  (Republican Party of Cameroon) - Georges Gilbert Baongla
 African Peoples Union (Union des Populations Africaines -UPA)
 Progressive Movement (Mouvement Progressiste)
 Believe in Cameroon (Croire au Cameroun)- Bernard Njonga
 Cameroon Renaissance Movement (Mouvement pour la Renaissance du Cameroun)- Maurice Kamto

References

Cameroon
Political parties
 
Political parties
Cameroon